Club Baloncesto Breogán, S.A.D., also known as Río Breogán for sponsorship reasons, is a professional basketball club based in Lugo, Spain. The team plays in the Liga ACB. The club was founded in 1966 by the Varela-Portas brothers. The team played for the first time in the Spanish top league in 1970. The name of the club is a reference to legendary Galician King Breogán.

The Breogán jerseys have always been sky blue with details in details in white or dark blue. The shorts have been also traditionally sky blue, with the exception of some years that have been white too. Their home arena is the Pazo dos Deportes, an arena with a seating capacity of 6.500 people. The Pazo has been one of the Top-10 European arenas in attendance and one of the first in relation to the city population. The current president of the team is José Antonio Caneda. Well-known players have included: Charlie Bell, Pete Mickeal, Velimir Perasović, José Miguel Antúnez, Alfonso Reyes, Tanoka Beard, Anthony Bonner, Claude Riley, James Donaldson, Greg Foster or, most recently, Džanan Musa .

History 

Founded in 1966, CB Breogán only needed five years to promote for the first time in its history to the Liga Nacional. It played in it from 1971 to 1977, except in the 1974–75 season, before dropping down again to lower divisions.

Breogán came back to the top tier, now named Liga ACB in 1984, and it qualified for playing the Korać Cup after finishing in the sixth position. It became a classic team in the league until 1995, when it lost to against Valvi Girona and became relegated to Liga EBA.

Its third era in Liga ACB started in 1999 and lasted seven years. In 2006, Breogán was the last qualified in the table and was relegated to LEB Oro, where it continued playing until 2018, when it promoted again to the top tier by winning the LEB Oro. Breogán were relegated the following year only managing to win 9 games out of 34. In 2021, Breogán were promoted to the top tier of Spanish basketball after beating Granada in the final. Breogán lost away from home in the first game but managed to win the second one at home and the final one in the Andalusian city.

Breogán made a brilliant start to the 2021/22 season. After winning the Galician Cup against rivals Obradoiro CAB, they won their first two Liga ACB games and visited FC Barcelona Bàsquet as leaders. Although a defeat there would mean they were no longer at the top of the table, they completed a tremendous first half of the league, qualifying for the Copa del Rey de Baloncesto for the first time in over 30 years, in which they suffered a narrow defeat against finalists Real Madrid Baloncesto. In January, head coach Paco Olmos decided to leave the club following an offer from relegation-bound CB San Pablo Burgos and was substituted by Veljko Mršić. Breogán's push to make it to the play-offs was hampered by star-man Džanan Musa's injury against Bàsquet Manresa. Trae Bell-Haynes got injured one week later as well, which resulted in Breogán being out of Play-off contention, although they were always far from being involved in a relegation battle. Džanan Musa became one of Breogán's most legendary players in the 2021/22 season.

Sponsorship naming 
CB Breogán has several denominations through the years due to its sponsorship:
Breogán Fontecelta 1971–73
Breogán La Casera 1973–77
Breogán Caixa Galicia 1985–86
Leite Río Breogán 1987, 2001–11, 2019–21
DYC Breogán 1989–93
DYC Lugo 1994
Breogán Universidade 2000–01
Ribeira Sacra Breogán Lugo 2014–2015
Cafés Candelas Breogán 2015–2019
Río Breogán 2021–present

Players

Current roster

Depth chart

Season by season

Trophies and awards

Trophies 
2nd division championships: (3)
 2ª División: (1) 1975
 LEB Oro: (3) 1999, 2018, 2021
Copa Princesa: (3)
2008, 2018, 2021
Copa Galicia: (14)
1986, 1987, 1998, 2000, 2002, 2003, 2004, 2005, 2007, 2008, 2009, 2018, 2021, 2022

Records 
23 seasons in the top division
6 in Primera División
17 in Liga ACB
1 participation in Korać Cup
1985–86 season: eliminated in quarterfinals group stage

Individual awards 
ACB MVP
Džanan Musa – 2021–22
All-ACB Team
Charlie Bell – 2004–05
Džanan Musa – 2021–22
ACB Top Scorer
Alfredo Pérez – 1971 (27,1)
Alfredo Pérez – 1973 (23,2)
Bob Fullarton – 1976 (30,3)
Velimir Perasović – 1993 (24,5)
Charlie Bell – 2005 (27,0)
Džanan Musa – 2022 (20,1)
ACB Three Point Shootout Champion
Jacobo Odriozola – 2002
Nebojša Bogavac – 2005
All-LEB Oro Team
Anthony Winchester – 2013
Álex Llorca – 2015
Jeff Xavier – 2016

Notable players 

 Santi Abad
 Alfonso Albert
 Alfons Alzamora
 José Miguel Antúnez
 Manuel Bosch
 Óscar Cervantes
 Pedro Cifré
 Alfonso Martínez
 Alfredo Pérez
 Alfonso Reyes
 Manel Sánchez
 Ángel Serrano
 Josep Maria Soler
 Salva Arco
 Jorge Racca
 Džanan Musa
 Sabahudin Bilalović
 Velimir Perasović
 Herve Kabasele
 James Feldeine
 Joseph Gomis
 Marco Carraretto
 Andrea Pecile
 Nebojša Bogavac
 Đuro Ostojić
 Roeland Schaftenaar
 Torgeir Bryn
 Rubén Garcés
 Nikola Lončar
 Volodymyr Gerun
 Jeff Adrien
 Tanoka Beard
 Charlie Bell
 Anthony Bonner
 Devin Davis
 James Donaldson
 Greg Foster
 Bob Fullarton
 Claude Gregory
 Tharon Mayes
 Pete Mickeal
 Sam Pellom
 Linton Townes
 Jimmy Wright

References

External links 
Official website
Eurobasket.com presentation

 
Basketball teams in Galicia (Spain)
Former LEB Oro teams
Rio Breogan
Basketball teams established in 1966
Sport in Lugo